Marwar Mathania is a village in Jodhpur district of Rajasthan, India. The town is the site of the oldest Karni Mata temple, constructed by Amaraji Charan in the 15th century.

Today, Mathania houses a wide variety of communities. Every year a puja (prayer) and a religious fair are organized on Kartik Poornima in memory of Satharam Parihar, who was killed during the demolition of the disputed Mosque of Babur, or Babri Masjid, in Ayodhya.

History
The village was given to Amraji Bapji in 1471 A.D. by King Rao Jodha, the founder of the Kingdom of Jodhpur and Marwar, as a reward for Amaraji Charan's service and loyalty. The tamrapatra, a scripted copper plate mentioning this deed, is still preserved and worshiped as a blessing along with Karni Mata's charan paduka (footwear), by the descendants of Amaraji Charan  and others at Karani Mataji's Temple.

Solar thermal power project
Asia's largest solar hybrid power project was proposed roughly 20 years ago near Mathania, but it is still awaiting approval. Designed as a unique project to demonstrate the technical and commercial viability of solar technology, it would have been one of the first of its kind in the world. The planned 140-megawatt power plant, situated roughly 30 kilometers from Jodhpur, would be owned by the Rajasthan State Power Corporation Limited (RSPCL).

Economics

In Mathania, a rising number of villagers find work in the public sector while a majority of residents earn a living through agriculture and construction.

Mathania is notable for its red chili and onion harvests. However, due to the decline in groundwater levels (approximately 1000 ft to 1200 ft), the planting of chili peppers is avoided by farmers who prefer more lucrative crop yields. Historically, Mathania was distinguished for the industrial production of mulmul, a type of cloth, but the textile factory was closed and is no longer functional. Mathania falls within the Rajasthan State Industrial Area, where many other factories are functioning.

The village has three banks: Central Bank of India (Maheshwari Samaj Bhawan), UCO Bank and State Bank of India.

Transportation
Mathania is connected to the city of Jodhpur via the Jodhpur-Phalodi state highway and other public transportation services, such as the train service constructed during British rule. Jodhpur Junction railway station is 38 km to the south and Osiyan Railway Station serves the area north of Marwar Mathania. Train connections include: the Delhi Sarai Rohilla-Jaisalmer Express; Jodhpur-Jaisalmer Express and Jodhpur-Jaisalmer Passenger.

Mathania is 38 km away from Jodhpur Airport. The bus stand offers frequent buses and private jeeps are available for rent.

Infrastructure

The village is divided into several neighborhoods: Chopasani Charanan; Tinwari; Ummed nagar; Rampura; Kotra; Rajasthani; Bhaiser and Jud. The village has several government offices, such as: a gram panchayat; a patwar bhawan; a post office; a police station; an electric board and the BSNL telephone exchange. Mathania also has a hospital, the 'Government General Hospital' and a clinic, the 'Government Ayurveda Dispensary'.

Schools
Mathania has several schools, including the Senior Higher Secondary School, Girls Sr. Secondary School, Government Boys and Girls Middle Schools, Param Tejasvi Maharana Pratap School, Mahadev Adarsh Vidhya Mandir Mathania School, Mangal Public School and Baba Ramdev School Rajasthani.

The Senior Higher Secondary School is affiliated with the Rajasthan Education Board and has a large campus. The school offers two main streams of education; arts, and sciences (including mathematics, chemistry and physics). The school has its own computer laboratory.

Notable people
 Raj Kamal (Music director)
 Arjun Deo Charan (Vice Chairman of the National School of Drama)

References

Cities and towns in Jodhpur district
Charan